Many celebrities have signed contracts with perfume houses to associate their name with a signature scent, as a self-promotion campaign. The scents are then marketed; the association with the celebrity's name usually being the selling point of the campaign. The designation of a celebrity fragrance is also a balance between the public figure's notoriety and the separate reputation of the brand. Paloma Picasso, Paris Hilton, and Ivanka Trump each have famous fathers, for instance, but the degrees to which each women are associated with beauty, fashion, and retail vary. Likewise, some public figures' fragrances might overshadow their reputations, like Hennessy heir Kilian Hennessy and his By Kilian collection.

List

#

A

B

C

D

E

F

G

H

I

J

K

L

M

N

O

P

R

S

T

U

V

W

X

Y

Z

References

 
Perfumes
Lists of brands
Fashion-related lists
Perfumes